Plateau iris is a medical condition of the eye resulting from anterior displacement of the peripheral iris by the ciliary body, causing angle closure glaucoma. First line treatment for all causes of narrow angle glaucoma is laser iridotomy. If narrow angle glaucoma persists after iridotomy, it is called plateau iris syndrome and subsequently managed either medically (miotics) or surgically (laser peripheral iridoplasty). This condition is sometimes discovered after an iridotomy causes a rapid increase in eye pressure. Due to its rarity, few ophthalmologists have experience with treating those affected by plateau iris syndrome.

References

Further reading
 
 
 
 
 
 
 
 
 

Human iris